Beaverdale may refer to:

Beaverdale, Georgia, an unincorporated community in Whitfield County
Beaverdale, Iowa (disambiguation)
Beaverdale, Pennsylvania, an unincorporated community and census-designated place (CDP) in Cambria County

See also
Beaver Dale, a community in Saskatchewan, Canada